Kumgaon Burti is a village, in Nandura tehsil of Buldhana district, Maharashtra State,  India. Nearby towns are Nandura on east, Shegaon on west.

Demographics
 India census, Kumgaon Burti has a population of xxxx.

Transport
This is a small railway station and is located between Nandura and Jalamb - Shegaon and is located on Bhusawal - Badnera section of Bhusawal division of Central Railway.

Description
The town post office Postal Index Number ( PIN code) is

References

Villages in Buldhana district